Jiang Yong (born 1963) is a Chinese scientist who is a chief designer at the Second Research Institute of China Aerospace Science and Industry Corporation, and an academician of the Chinese Academy of Sciences.

Biography 
Jiang was born in Anxiang County, Changde, in 1963. After resuming the college entrance examination in 1979, he was accepted to National University of Defense Technology. After university, he joined the China Aerospace Science and Industry Corporation.

Honours and awards 
 18 November 2021 Member of the Chinese Academy of Sciences (CAS)

References 

1963 births
Living people
People from Anxiang County
Scientists from Hunan
National University of Defense Technology alumni
Members of the Chinese Academy of Sciences